Richard can be a surname. Variations include: Ricard, Riccard(s), Richard(s), Ritchard, Richardson, Richardsson, Ricquart, Rijkaard, Rickaert, Ryckewaert

Geographical distribution
As of 2014, 27.4% of all known bearers of the surname Richard were residents of Tanzania (frequency 1:354), 25.9% of France (1:481), 14.0% of the United States (1:4,847), 8.7% of Nigeria (1:3,806), 7.0% of Canada (1:985), 2.0% of Madagascar (1:2,178), 1.9% of Haiti (1:1,046), 1.5% of Sudan (1:4,677), 1.3% of Togo (1:1,021) and 1.2% of Kenya (1:7,138).

In France, the frequency of the surname was higher than national average (1:481) in the following regions:
 1. Collectivity of Saint Martin (1:119)
 2. Pays de la Loire (1:222)
 3. Centre-Val de Loire (1:319)
 4. Bourgogne-Franche-Comté (1:373)
 5. Brittany (1:375)
 6. Grand Est (1:422)
 7. Nouvelle-Aquitaine (1:462)
 8. Normandy (1:474)

People
Persons with the surname include:

A to D
Achille Richard (1794–1852), French botanist and physician
Adam Richard, Australian comedian
Alain Richard (born 1945), French politician
Alfred Léon Gérault-Richard (1860–1911), French journalist and politician
Alison Richard (born 1948), English academic administrator
Ambrose D. Richard (1850–1917), Canadian lawyer and politician
Antoine Richard (born 1960), French athlete
Antoine Richard du Cantal (1802–1891), a French doctor, veterinarian, agronomist and politician
Bernard Richard (born 1951), Canadian social worker, lawyer, and politician
Carl J. Richard, American historian
Charles Richard (born 1900), Canadian politician
Charles-Louis Richard (1711–1794), French Catholic theologian
Charlie Richard (1941–1994), American football player and coach
Chris Richard (baseball) (born 1974), American baseball player
Chris Richard (basketball) (born 1984), professional basketball player
Christian Rémi Richard (born 1941), Malagasy politician and diplomat
Clayton Richard (born 1983), American baseball player
Clément Richard (born 1939), Canadian lawyer, businessman and politician
Cliff Richard (born 1940), English pop star
Clovis-Thomas Richard (1892–1976), Canadian lawyer and politician
Cyprien Richard (born 1979), French alpine skier
Darryl Richard (American football) (born 1986), American football player
Dawn Richard (model) (born 1936), American model and actress
Dawn Richard (singer) (born 1983), Haitian-American singer, songwriter, and dancer
Deb Richard (born 1963), American golfer
Dee Richard (born 1955), American politician
Doug Richard, British-based American businessman

E to G
Edmond Richard (cinematographer) (born 1927), French cinematographer
Edmond Richard (writer), French writer
Édouard Richard (1844–1904), Canadian historian and politician
Emily Richard (born 1948), British actress
Eric Richard (born 1940), English actor
Ernest Richard (1922–2006), Canadian businessman and politician
Etienne Richard (c. 1621 – 1669), French composer, organist and harpsichordist
Fabrice Richard (born 1973), French footballer
Ferdinand Richard (born 1950), French musician
Firmine Richard (born 1947), Guadeloupean actress
François Fleury-Richard (1777–1852), French painter
François-Marie-Benjamin Richard (1819–1908), French archbishop
Gabriel Richard (1767–1832), French-American Roman Catholic priest turned politician
Gary Richard American football player
George Anderson Richard (1861–1943), mine manager in Queensland, Australia
Georges Richard (died 1922), French automobile pioneer
Gerry Richard, Canadian curler and coach
Graham Richard, American politician
Guy A. Richard (born 1932), Canadian judge

H to J
Henri Richard (1936-2020), Canadian ice hockey player
Henry Richard (1812–1888), Welsh Congregational minister and Member of Parliament
Ivor Richard, Baron Richard (born 1932), British politician
J. R. Richard (1950–2021), American baseball player
Jacques Richard (1952–2002), Canadian ice hockey player
Jamey Richard (born 1984), American football player
Jean-Baptiste-Tréfflé Richard (1856–1927), Canadian farmer, notary and politician
Jean-Claude Richard (1727–1791), French painter and engraver
Jean-Louis Richard (born 1927), French actor, film director and scriptwriter
 Jean-Marc Richard (ice hockey) (born 1966), retired Canadian ice hockey player
 Jean-Marc Richard (TV and radio presenter) (born 1960), Swiss radio and television personality
Jean-Marie Richard (1879–1955), Canadian politician
Jean Michel Claude Richard (1787–1868), French botanist
Jean-Pierre Richard (1922–2019), French writer and literary critic
Jean-Thomas Richard (1907–1991), Canadian politician
Jean Richard (1921–2001), French actor
Jean Richard (historian), French historian
John Richard (born 1934), Canadian judge
Joseph-Adolphe Richard (1887–1964), Canadian politician
Jules Richard (mathematician) (1862–1956), French mathematician who stated Richard's paradox

K to M
Kris Richard (born 1979), American football coach
Larry Richard (born 1965), American basketball player
Lee Richard, American baseball player
Lorraine Richard (born 1959), Canadian politician
Louis Claude Richard (1754–1821), French botanist
Marcel Richard (1907–1976), French Catholic priest and Greek paleographer
Margie Eugene-Richard, American environmental activist
Mary Richard (1940–2010), Canadian aboriginal activist and politician
Maurice Richard (1921–2000), Canadian ice hockey player
Maurice Richard (politician) (born 1946), Canadian politician
Mark Richard, American short story writer, novelist, screenwriter, and poet
Marthe Richard (1889–1982), French prostitute and spy who later became a politician
Michael Richard (1948–2006), American rock musician and photographer
Michael Wayne Richard (1959–2007), American rapist and murderer
Michel Richard (born 1948), French chef
Mike Richard (born 1966), Canadian ice hockey player
Mireille Richard (born 1989), Swiss ski mountaineer
Monique Richard, Canadian politician

N to Z
Natalie Richard, Canadian television personality
Nathalie Richard (born 1962), French actress
Nelly Richard, French-born cultural theorist now based in Chile
Oliver G. Richard, American businessman
Olivier Jules Richard (1836–1896), French botanist who studied lichens
Pascal Richard (born 1964), Swiss racing cyclist
Paul Richard, Mayor of New York from 1735 to 1739
Philippe Richard (1891–1973), French actor
Pierre Richard (born 1934), French actor
,  (born 1941)
Pierre Richard-Willm (1895–1983), French actor
Robert Ri'chard (born 1983), American television and movie actor
Rod Richard (born 1932), American athlete
Ron Richard (born 1947), American politician
Ronald G. Richard (born 1968), American Marine Corps officer
Ruth Richard (born 1928), American baseball player
Sabrina Richard (born 1977), French weightlifter
Stanley Richard (born 1967), American football player
Ted Richard, Canadian politician and lawyer
Timothy Richard (1845–1919), Welsh Baptist missionary to China
Tyran Richard (born 1982), American model
Viola Richard (1904–1973), American actress
Virgil A. Richard (born 1937), American army general and gay rights activist
Wendy Richard (1943–2009), English actress
Zachary Richard (born 1950), American Cajun singer/songwriter and poet
 (1832—1890), Russian and French dancer of French origin, the wife of Louis Mérante

See also
Richard
Richards (surname)

References

Surnames
French-language surnames
English-language surnames